Anna Gordon Keown (1899–1957) was an English writer and poet.

She married writer and physician Philip Gosse (1879–1959), son of Edmund Gosse.  When she died, her husband presented a large collection of literature to the University of Leeds in her memory, known as the Keown Collection (which is within the larger Brotherton Collection).

Among her works, perhaps the most famous is her book The Cat who saw God (1932), a comic drama about a cat who is possessed by the Roman Emperor Nero who decides to settle down with an old English spinster.  In the week beginning 14 November 1932, Time listed it as one of their "Books of the Week", noting it as "amusing in the English manner.".

Another of her best-known works is a sonnet she wrote in her youth during World War I.  Entitled Reported Missing, it is studied to this day in British schools as part of the OCR GCSE English literature syllabus.

Reported Missing

References

1899 births
1957 deaths
English women poets
English women novelists
English World War I poets
20th-century English women writers
20th-century English novelists